Stefano Visconti (c. 1287 – 4 July 1327) was a member of the House of Visconti that ruled Milan from the 14th to the 15th century.

Family
He was the son of Matteo I Visconti.

In 1318 he married Valentina Doria, daughter of Bernabò Doria from Sassello and of Eliena Fieschi, with whom he had three children: 
Matteo II
Galeazzo II
Bernabò, who shared the rule in Milan after his death.

Death

Stefano died in the night of July 4, 1327, after a banquet he gave Louis the Bavarian, shortly after he was crowned King of Italy

His contemporaries linked his death to an attempted poisoning of the King, leading to the imprisonment of three of Stefanos' four brothers, Galeazzo, Giovanni, and Luchino, as well as of his nephew, the future Lord of Milan, Azzo Visconti, in the fortress of Monza: This event marked a crisis of the relations between the Holy Roman Empire and the Visconti.

The magnificent tomb of Stefano and his wife Valentina, carved in 1359 by Bonino da Campione, is located in the Basilica Sant'Eustorgio in Milan.

Ancestry

References

Sources

1327 deaths
14th-century Italian nobility
Stefano
Year of birth unknown